Ctenobactrites is an extinct genus of cephalopods that lived from the Carboniferous to the Permian. It contains seven valid species which have been found in Europe, Asia, and North America. It was originally assigned to the order Bactritida, but has been proposed to be a potential member of the order Mixosiphonata.

References

Prehistoric cephalopod genera
Molluscs described in 1951